Ana María Norbis (born 15 August 1947) is a Uruguayan former swimmer. She competed in three events at the 1968 Summer Olympics.

References

1947 births
Living people
Uruguayan female swimmers
Olympic swimmers of Uruguay
Swimmers at the 1968 Summer Olympics
Sportspeople from Paysandú
Swimmers at the 1967 Pan American Games
Pan American Games silver medalists for Uruguay
Pan American Games bronze medalists for Uruguay
Pan American Games medalists in swimming
Medalists at the 1967 Pan American Games